Three Days Later is a 2013 Italian black comedy film directed by Daniele Grassetti.

The film premiered at the Giffoni Film Festival on 26 July 2013 and was theatrically released on 1 June 2016.

Cast

References

External links

2013 films
2010s Italian-language films
2013 comedy films
Italian comedy films
2013 black comedy films
Italian black comedy films
Films set in Rome
2010s Italian films